AACT may refer to:

 Academy of Arts, Careers and Technology, a career-tech high school in Reno, Nevada
 Aggregate Analysis of ClinicalTrials.gov, a database of clinical trials data. See  Data sources section
 Alpha 1-antichymotrypsin, a protein
 American Academy of Clinical Toxicology
 American Association of Community Theatre